The 2012–13 Top League was the tenth season of Japan's domestic rugby union competition, the Top League. It kicked off on 31 August 2012. The final was held on 27 January 2013 and won by Suntory Sungoliath to claim their third Top League title.

Teams

Regular season

The 14 teams played a round-robin tournament for the 2012–13 Top League regular season.

The top 4 qualified for the title play-offs to fight for the Microsoft Cup and the Top League title. The top 4 also qualified directly into the All-Japan Rugby Football Championship.

Teams ranked 5th to 10th went through to the wildcard play-offs for qualification into the All-Japan Rugby Football Championship. Teams ranked 13th and 14th went to the promotion and relegation play-offs against regional challengers to fight to remain in the Top League.

Table

Fixtures and results

Round 1

Round 2

Round 3

Round 4

Round 5

Round 6

Round 7

Round 8

Round 9

Round 10

Round 11

Round 12

Round 13

Title play-offs
Top 4 sides of the regular season competed in the Microsoft Cup (2013) knock out tournament to fight for the Top League title. The top 4 teams of 2012–13 were Suntory Sungoliath, Toshiba Brave Lupus, Panasonic Wild Knights, and Kobe Steel Kobelco Steelers.

Semi-finals

Final

Wildcard play-offs
The two second round winners qualified for the All-Japan Rugby Football Championship.

First round
The Top League teams ranked 7th and 10th played-off for the right to meet the Top League team ranked 5th in the second round. The Top League teams ranked 8th and 9th played-off for the right to meet the Top League team ranked 6th in the second round. 

So Kintetsu and NEC progressed to the second round.

Second round
The Top League team ranked 5th played-off against the winner of the teams ranked 7th and 10th, and the Top League team ranked 6th played-off against the winner of the teams ranked 8th and 9th. The two winning second round teams advanced to the All-Japan Rugby Football Championship.

So Toyota and Yamaha advanced to the All-Japan Rugby Football Championship.

Top League Challenge Series

Coca-Cola West Red Sparks and Kubota Spears won promotion to the 2013–14 Top League via the 2012–13 Top League Challenge Series, while Mitsubishi Sagamihara DynaBoars and Toyota Industries Shuttles progressed to the promotion play-offs.

Promotion and relegation play-offs
The Top League teams ranked 14th and 13th played-off against the Challenge 1 teams ranked 3rd and 4th respectively, for the right to be included in the Top League for the following season.

So Toyota Industries was promoted, Sanix was relegated, and NTT remained in the Top League for the next season.

End-of-season awards
Awards for the Top League season, including the Best XV, were chosen by a panel of members of the media, coaches and captains. The Best XV for the 2012-13 season was spread across six different clubs.

Team awards

Individual awards

Team of the season

References

External links
 

Top League
Japan Rugby League One
Top